The Day of the Capital City of Kazakhstan is an official public holiday in Kazakhstan. It was established in 2009 and is celebrated on July 6 to celebrate the capital city of Kazakhstan, Astana (formerly known as Nur-Sultan). The holiday also coincides with the birthday of ex-President Nursultan Nazarbayev.

On 6 July 1994, the Supreme Council of Kazakhstan adopted a resolution to transfer the capital of Kazakhstan from Almaty to Akmola. On 6 May 1998, Akmola was renamed to Astana and gained status as the capital city. On 18 July 2008, the government approved a bill making Capital Day a state holiday.

Celebrations
On Capital City Day in 2005, Jastar Park on Dóńgelek Square was unveiled. 

Since 2009, the most famous brass bands in the country and around the world perform at the Astana Samaly International Festival. The day will end with fireworks over Yessil River embankment, as well as a city park. A military tattoo known as the Eskeri Kernei ("Military Trumpet") International Festival is held on Capital City Day, held annually since 2012 under the auspices and support of the Nur-Sultan Mayor’s Office. It exists with the participation of military bands in the Military Band Service such as the Presidential Band of the State Security Service and foreign bands such as the Band of the Armed Forces of Mongolia and the Brass Band of the Government of Tuva.

The 2020 celebrations coincided with the 80th birthday of Nursultan Nazarbayev. The celebratory events were held virtually due to the COVID-19 pandemic in the country.

See also 
 Public holidays in Kazakhstan

References 

Events in Astana
Observances in Kazakhstan
Public holidays in Kazakhstan
Kazakhstani culture
Summer events in Kazakhstan